Keathley is a surname. Notable people with the surname include:

George D. Keathley (1917–1944), US Army staff sergeant who received the Medal of Honor for actions in World War II
USNS Sgt. George D Keathley (T-APC-117), World War II United States cargo vessel
Kevin Keathley, basketball coach and author